"No Body, No Crime" (stylized in all lowercase) is a song written and recorded by American singer-songwriter Taylor Swift, featuring guest vocals from American rock band Haim. It was released to US country radio by Republic and MCA Nashville on January 11, 2021, as a single from Swift's ninth studio album Evermore (2020).

Produced by Swift and Aaron Dessner, "No Body, No Crime" has a country production, however it uses a pure western composition as opposed to the country rock and pop rock genres Swift has been known for. A murder ballad, it has noir-inspired lyrics about a fictional character Este, who is killed by her husband after she discovers his infidelity. Unable to prove the husband guilty, the song's narrator, a dear friend of Este, avenges her friend's death by murdering the husband, erases key evidences, and indirectly frames the mistress, who herself suspects the narrator. The central character is named after Este Haim, the band's bass player.

Music critics lauded "No Body, No Crime" for its cinematic storytelling and country production. The single reached the top 20 on charts in Australia, Canada, Ireland, and the United Kingdom. In the United States, the track peaked at number two on the Hot Country Songs chart and number 34 on the Billboard Hot 100, marking Haim's first Hot 100 entry. After its release to US country radio, "No Body, No Crime" peaked at number 54 on the Country Airplay chart.

Background and release
 
"No Body, No Crime" marks the first collaboration between Swift and Haim. The song was written by Swift on a rubber-bridge guitar. She forwarded her voice memo of the song to Aaron Dessner, her Evermore producer, who developed the song's instrumentation. Swift had specific ideas on how she wanted the song to feel, including Haim's vocals on the song. The Haim sisters recorded at engineer Ariel Rechtshaid's Los Angeles home studio, and sent it to Swift, who was at Dessner's Long Pond studio, filming Folklore: The Long Pond Studio Sessions (2020). The harmonica and guitar riffs on the song were provided by Josh Kaufman, who also played the harmonica on "Betty" (2020), the fourteenth track on Folklore. JT Bates played the drums on "No Body, No Crime", who also contributed the drums on "Dorothea", eighth track on Evermore.

On December 10, 2020, Swift revealed the track listing of Evermore, where "No Body, No Crime" placed sixth; the album was released on December 11, 2020. MCA Nashville released "No Body, No Crime" to United States country radio stations on January 11, 2021. In an interview to Entertainment Weekly, Swift said working with Haim "was pretty hilarious because it came about after I wrote a pretty dark murder mystery song and had named the character Este, because she's the friend I have who would be stoked to be in a song like that" and added that she "had finished the song and was nailing down some lyric details and texted [Este Haim], 'You're not going to understand this text for a few days but... which chain restaurant do you like best?' and I named a few." Swift revealed that Este Haim chose Olive Garden, and that she, a few days later, sent Haim the song and asked if they would sing on it; the answer was an "immediate YES".

Composition and lyrics 
Opening with police sirens, "No Body, No Crime" is a twangy and cinematic, country, pop rock, and country rock song, with heavy harmonica in the key of G minor, incorporating elements of Americana. It tells a macabre story of a woman named Este, who confronts her cheating husband. She goes missing and the song's narrator suspects she was murdered by him in favor of his mistress. Without the body of the victim, the husband cannot be tried for homicide. Este's friend takes justice into her own hands and kills the husband, dumping his body in a lake. Este's sister becomes an alibi who testifies they were together ("she was with me, dude") and frames the mistress who took out a large life insurance policy. Este is named after Este Haim. The song drew comparisons to the Chicks' "Goodbye Earl" (2000) and Carrie Underwood's "Before He Cheats" (2006) among others.

Critical reception 
Brodie Lancaster of The Sydney Morning Herald opined that "No Body, No Crime" sees Swift and the Haim sisters "stomp through a saloon-style remake of Chicago's "He Had it Comin'" as they tell of a mad woman who covers up the murder of her cheating husband". Bobby Olivier of Spin thought the song follows Carrie Underwood's model of taking "down a cheater with a catchy refrain and a sprinkle of … what's that? … murder?!". Chris Willman of Variety found the song to be the album's "pure spirit of fun" moment, away from the ruminating themes of other tracks. He characterized "No Body, No Crime" as a dark "spirited double-murder ballad" inspired by The Chicks' 2000 single "Goodbye, Earl".

Stereogum critic Tom Breihan defined the song as the "willfully silly murder narrative" that works as a take on "Goodbye Earl", and commended it as "the most country thing that Swift has done in years". USA Today writer Patrick Ryan dubbed the song a "scorching" track that makes Swift's "mischievous return" to her country roots. Describing the placement "No Body, No Crime" in Evermore, Jason Lipshutz of Billboard stated that the "delicious" song provides "hope and levity" amidst of the album's emotional "wreckage". NME critic Hannah Mylrea noted the song's sonic direction, and described it as a "full-blown country revenge song that ends in the murder of a philandering husband", condensing a David Fincher film in a matter of few minutes.

On a less positive side, Robert Christgau said although "No Body, No Crime" was the first track he paid attention to on Evermore thanks to a strong hook, it became his least favorite after repeated listens; Christgau described it as "super-hooky but pat police procedural". In Vulture, Justin Curto complimented Haim's backing vocals for livening up Evermore "static pacing", but found the narrative rather dull and Swift's songwriting not as strong as on her past songs about revenge: "It's better suited to soundtrack an episode of a soapy TV show than any heartbreak." Nate Jones, also from Vulture, found the track "more like a musical costume party than a genuine attempt at embodying darkness".

Commercial performance 
"No Body, No Crime" debuted at number 34 in the US Billboard Hot 100 and number two on the Hot Country Songs chart, marking Haim's first entry on both charts. After the song was released to US country radio, it entered the Billboard Country Airplay chart on January 30, 2021 and later peaked at number 54. In Australia, "No Body, No Crime" reached number 16 on the ARIA Singles Chart and number two on the TMN Country Hot 50 chart. Elsewhere, the song debuted on several single charts worldwide, peaking within the top 40 of Canada (11), Ireland (11), the United Kingdom (19), Singapore (28), New Zealand (29), and further reaching Slovakia (73) and Portugal (83). "No Body, No Crime" ultimately peaked at number 16 on the Billboard Global 200.

Impact 
Gene Lee, the CEO of American casual dining restaurant chain Olive Garden credited Swift for gathering social interactions with the brand after she mentioned the name of the brand on one of her lyrics on the song, said that "Just think about what happened last week when Taylor Swift dropped the song with Olive Garden in it, and how we were able to capture that socially and create buzz around that. When Taylor Swift drops our name in a song, our brand becomes very, very relevant".

Credits and personnel
Credits adapted from Pitchfork.

 Taylor Swift − lead vocals, songwriting, production
 Haim – featured artist
 Danielle Haim − backing vocals
 Este Haim − backing vocals
 Aaron Dessner  − production, recording, mandolin, synthesizers, piano, field recording and bass, acoustic and electric guitars
 Josh Kaufman − lap steel, electric guitar, organ and harmonica
 J.T. Bates − drum kit, instrumental recording
 Jonathan Low − vocal recording, mixing
 Ariel Rechtshaid − vocal recording
 Matt DiMona − vocal recording
 Greg Calbi − mastering
 Steve Fallone − mastering

Charts

Release history

References

2020s ballads
2020 songs
2021 singles
Country ballads
American country music songs
American pop rock songs
Country rock songs
Haim (band) songs
Murder ballads
Songs written by Taylor Swift
Song recordings produced by Taylor Swift
Song recordings produced by Aaron Dessner
Songs about infidelity
Songs about revenge
Taylor Swift songs
Republic Records singles